Tyron Thomson Mbuenimo (born 5 November 2003) is an English footballer who plays as a defender for Bristol Rovers.

Career

Early career
Mbuenimo started his career in the youth system of Tottenham Hotspur before being released. After Tottenham he joined the 'Onside Academy' who try to get players back into league clubs.

Bristol Rovers
Mbuenimo joined Bristol Rovers in the May 2020 following a successful trial period. On 13 October 2021, Mbuenimo made his senior debut, coming off of he bench in an EFL Trophy group-stage defeat to Chelsea U21s.

Yate Town (loan)
On 9 September 2021, Mbuenimo joined Southern League Premier Division side Yate Town on a one-month youth loan deal. He made his debut for the club off of the bench 6 days later in a 2–0 home defeat to Truro City.

Career Statistics

References

2003 births
Living people
English footballers
Association football forwards
Tottenham Hotspur F.C. players
Bristol Rovers F.C. players
Yate Town F.C. players
Southern Football League players